Iman Benson (born June 25, 2000) is an American actress from Atlanta, Georgia best known for her roles in Uncle Buck, Alexa & Katie, BlackAF, and The Midnight Club.

Filmography

References

External links 
 

2000 births
American television actresses
Living people
Place of birth missing (living people)
Actresses from Atlanta
21st-century American actresses
African-American actresses
21st-century African-American women
21st-century African-American people
20th-century African-American people
20th-century African-American women